Emil Sutor (June 19, 1888 – August 13, 1974) was a German sculptor. He was born in Offenburg and died in Karlsruhe. In 1936 he won a gold medal in the art competitions of the Olympic Games for his "Hürdenläufer" ("Hurdle runners").

References

External links
 profile

1888 births
1974 deaths
Olympic gold medalists in art competitions
20th-century German sculptors
20th-century German male artists
German male sculptors
Medalists at the 1936 Summer Olympics
Olympic competitors in art competitions